Paradip Refinery is an oil refinery set up by Indian Oil Corporation in Paradip city in the state of Odisha. The installed capacity of refinery is 15 million tonnes per year. This refinery is capable to produce high yield of  LPG and propylene. The refinery can produce various petroleum products like gasoline, diesel, kerosene, aviation turbine fuel, Propylene, Sulphur and Petroleum Coke. The refinery is also designed to produce total Premium quality Gasoline variants for export. This refinery is IndianOil’s first refinery with single Atmospheric Column for processing 15.0 Million Metric Tonnes Per Annum. The refinery is in a synergic partnership with the environment as this is a zero effluent discharge refinery and with strictly monitored and controlled stack emissions which are uplinked on real time basis to the server of Central Pollution Control Board.

History
Paradip Refinery is IndianOil’s 11th Refinery. It was dedicated in the service of the nation by PM Shri Narendra Modi on February 7, 2016. Envisioned as the Energy Gateway to Eastern India, the 15 million tonnes per year Refinery has been set up at an estimated cost of Rs. 52,555 crore. The foundation stone for the refinery was laid by former Prime Minister Atal Bihari Vajpayee in May 2002.

Commissioning
The refinery expected to start production in the third quarter of 2013. Due to delays the cost of refinery project has increased by 2.5%.It was finally inaugurated by Prime Minister Narendra Modi on February 7, 2016.

The refinery is built at a cost of Rs 34,555 crore and can process dirty and heavy crude oil from Latin America.

The refinery sent out its first consignment of products comprising diesel, kerosene, LPG on November 22, 2015.

At present the refinery is fully operational and is producing BS-VI complaint Fuel.
A petrochemical Complex comprising PP units, ERU-MEG Unit and PX-PTA Units are also coming up under the Petchem Complex

A Polypropylene Plant is also commissioned in FY 2019-20 in the refinery Premises and PP product is also being Produced.

ERU-MEG Unit is planned for commissioning in FY:2021-22.
PX-PTA PROJECT  is slated for commissioning in FY 2023-24

State support
The Government of Odisha has announced nil sales tax on the refinery products for the period of 11 years.

IOCL Paradip Refinery Township
It is a private residential area spread over 300 acres of land, composed of Bungalows and Housing Quarters for the employees of Paradip Refinery. Facilities include Estate complex, Hospital, Clubs, Community center, Bank, School, Swimming pool, Guest house, Horticultural Nursery, Market complex, Temple, Children parks, Stadium, Well maintained parks, lawns etc. are available here.

References

External links 
IndianOil Refining
Paradip Refinery

Oil refineries in India
Indian Oil Corporation
Energy in Odisha
Indian Oil Corporation buildings and structures
2016 establishments in Odisha
Energy infrastructure completed in 2016